Kaļķu iela (Lime Street) is a street in the medieval old town of Riga, Latvia. The street begins at the central square Rātslaukums and goes to the North East as far as the boundary of the historical centre. Brīvības iela and Brīvības bulvāris form a continuation of Kaļķu iela.

History
The street was first mentioned in 1407. In 1950, during the Soviet occupation of Latvia, Kaļķu iela was merged with Brīvības iela and Brīvības bulvāris to form the central street of Soviet Riga that was called Lenin Street.

Notable buildings

 Number 6 - The Chimneysweeper House, built in the 18th century, later rebuilt in 1896 by architect Wilhelm Bockslaff and in 2004;

References

Streets in Riga